The armored cruiser was a type of warship of the late 19th and early 20th centuries. It was designed like other types of cruisers to operate as a long-range, independent warship, capable of defeating any ship apart from a battleship and fast enough to outrun any battleship it encountered.

For many decades, naval technology had not advanced far enough for designers to produce a cruiser which combined an armored belt with the long range and high speed required to fulfill its mission. For this reason, beginning in the 1880s and 1890s, many navies preferred to build protected cruisers, which only relied on a light armored deck to protect the vital parts of the ship. However, by the late 1880s, the development of modern rapid-fire breech-loading cannon and high-explosive shells made the reintroduction of side armor a necessity. The invention of face-hardened armor in the mid-1890s offered effective protection with less weight than previously.

Varying in size, the armored cruiser was distinguished from other types of cruiser by its belt armor—thick iron (or later steel) plating on much of the hull to protect the ship from shellfire much like that on battleships. The first armored cruiser, the Imperial Russian Navy's , was launched in 1873 and combined sail and steam propulsion. By the 1890s, cruisers had abandoned sail and took on a modern appearance.

In 1908, the armored cruiser was supplanted by the battlecruiser, which, with armament equivalent to that of a dreadnought battleship and speed equivalent to that of a cruiser, was faster and more powerful than an armored cruiser. At around the same time, the term "light cruiser" came into use for small cruisers with armored belts. Although they were now considered second-rate ships, armored cruisers were widely used in World War I. Most surviving armored cruisers from this conflict were scrapped under the terms of the Washington Naval Treaty of 1922, which imposed limits on warships and defined a cruiser as a ship of 10,000 tons or less carrying guns of 8-inch caliber or less—rather smaller than many of the large armored cruisers. A handful survived in one form or another until World War II. Only one, the Greek Navy's Georgios Averof, has survived to the modern day as a museum ship.

History

Background

The armored cruiser was developed in the 1870s as an attempt to combine the virtues of the armored ironclad warship and the fast and long-ranged, but unarmored, cruisers of the time. Such a ship was desirable to protect overseas trade and, especially for the French and British, to police their vast overseas empires. The concern within higher naval circles was that without ships that could fulfill these requirements and incorporate new technology, their fleet would become obsolete and ineffective should a war at sea arise. Concern over obsolescence in official circles was further fueled by the race between the increasing size of naval guns and of armor strong enough to withstand such fire. This gun could penetrate up to 34 inches of wrought iron, the earliest form of naval armor. These were muzzle-loading guns, as had been used on ships from the 1500s. Breech-loading cannon, which were readopted into naval use in the 1870s, were more destructive than muzzle loaders due to their higher rate of fire. The development of rifled cannon, which improved accuracy, and advancements in shells were other factors. Although a cruiser would not likely face the largest-caliber guns of a battleship and many navies commonly used smaller weapons as they did not wear out as fast as larger ones did, cruisers still needed some form of protection to preclude being shot to pieces.

The adoption of rolled iron armor in 1865 and sandwich armor in 1870 gave ships a chance to withstand fire from larger guns. Both these protective schemes used wood as an important component, which made them extremely heavy and limited speed, the key factor in a cruiser's ability to perform its duties satisfactorily. While the first ocean-going ironclads had been launched around 1860, the "station ironclads" built for long-range colonial service such as the British  and French  were too slow, at 13 and 11 knots respectively, to raid enemy commerce or hunt down enemy commerce raiders, tasks usually assigned to frigates or corvettes. Powered by both sail and steam but without the additional weight of armor, these ships could reach speeds of up to 16 or 17 knots. The most powerful among them were the British , the U.S. Navy's  and the French . The British especially had hoped to rely on these vessels to serve the more distant reaches of its empire. In the aftermath of the Battle of Hampton Roads in 1862, where United States wooden warships were defeated by the Confederate ironclad , the Admiralty realized that its ships could theoretically encounter an ironclad in any theater of operation.

Ship propulsion was improving but was also taking time to develop. Naval engines in the 1860s were single-expansion types, in which steam was expanded into a cylinder, pushed a piston and was released. Compounding, where steam is passed through a series of cylinders of increasing size before being released, was a more efficient process; it allowed the steam to generate more energy and use less coal to go the same distance. With greater efficiency came increasingly complex machinery and the larger potential for breakdown. However, advances in metallurgy and engineering, the potential for smaller bunkerage and the successful use of compounding in commercial engines made it an attractive option for naval engines, as well. By the 1870s, compound engines had become standard for warships. Compounding by itself did not increase power or speed significantly, although it allowed for a much greater operating range. Forced-draught systems would help increase power and speed but would not come into use until the early 1890s.

1870s: First armored cruisers

Armed with six  and two  guns, she and her sister  were not fully armored but protected only by a narrow belt along the waterline. This belt, moreover, was so heavy that it sat below the ships' waterlines, which limited its benefit still further. Since they were iron-hulled, however, they were more durable than their wooden counterparts. With a top speed of only  and a high coal consumption, which necessitated a full sailing rig, they were not really suited for the role of cruiser. Nevertheless, these ships were considered a new threat to British commerce in the event of war, the rationale being that any vessel, regardless of its speed, could technically be a threat to overseas commerce.

Two ships of the  followed, armed with four 10-inch and eight 9-inch guns. These early armored cruisers were essentially scaled-down versions of the first-rate ironclad warships of the time and, like their Russian counterparts, were essentially belted cruisers. Their 9-inch belts were thicker than that of the Russians but did not extend the full length of the hull due to weight but tapered off at both ends. Past this belt, the designers placed a  armored deck, situated deepest in the ships, to guard magazines and machinery against plunging fire. Above this deck, space was allocated for coal bunkers and storerooms. These areas served a two-fold purpose. The bunkers served as added protection, since two feet of coal was considered the equivalent of one foot of steel. Also, if either of the ships became flooded from battle damage, it was hoped the contents of the bunkers and storerooms would aid in their continued buoyancy. Because of this unarmored protection, these ships could be considered the first protected cruisers. However, these ships also shared the liabilities of the Russian ones and because of this, the British navy was never happy with them. Their armor belts also sat below the ships' waterlines, which made them of limited benefit.

The underlying problem with these early warships was that technology had not caught up to the demands being made of them; therefore, they represented a series of compromises and could not be fully effective. They were typically powered by double-expansion steam engines fed by boilers which generated steam at perhaps 60 or 70 psi pressure, which gave relatively poor efficiency and short range. Even with improved engines, the dearth of overseas refueling stations made a full sailing rig a necessity. As sailing ships required a high freeboard and a large degree of stability, the use of armored turrets as used on monitors and some battleships was ruled out, because a turret was a very heavy weight high in the ship and its placement necessitated a lower freeboard than was warranted for an oceangoing vessel. Consequently, armored cruisers retained a more traditional broadside arrangement. Their armor was distributed in a thick belt around the waterline along most of their length; the gun positions on deck were not necessarily armored at all. The limitations of these ships would not be rectified fully until decades after their construction.

Meanwhile, a battle in May 1877 between the British unarmored cruiser  and the Peruvian monitor  demonstrated the need for more and better-protected cruisers. Shah and the smaller wooden corvette  hit Huáscar more than 50 times without causing significant damage. The Peruvian ship had an inexperienced crew unused to its cumbersome machinery, and managed to fire only six rounds, all of which missed. The engagement demonstrated the value of cruisers with armor protection.

Rise of the protected cruiser in the 1880s

During the 1870s, the rapid increase in the size and power of armor-piercing guns caused problems for the designers of battleships and cruisers alike. Even a ship designed with adequate armor protection from the current generation of guns might be vulnerable to new guns powerful enough to penetrate its armor. Consequently, naval designers tried a novel method of armoring their ships. The vital parts—engines, boilers, magazines and enough hull structure to keep the ship stable in the event of damage—could be positioned underneath an armored deck just below the waterline. This deck, which would only be struck very obliquely by shells, could be thinner and lighter than belt armor. The sides of the ship would be entirely unarmored but would be as effective as an armored belt which would not stop shellfire. Cruisers designed along these guidelines, known as protected cruisers, superseded armored cruisers in the 1880s and early 1890s.

As mentioned earlier, the armored cruiser Shannon was the first ship to make use of an armored deck. However, by the end of the 1870s, ships could be found with full–length armored decks and little or no side armor. The Italian  of very fast battleships had armored decks and guns but no side armor. The British used a full-length armored deck in their  of corvettes started in 1878; however the Comus class were designed for colonial service and were only capable of  speed, not fast enough for commerce protection or fleet duties.

The breakthrough for the protected cruiser design came with the Chilean , designed and built by the British firm Armstrong at their Elswick yard. Esmeralda set the tone for cruiser construction for the years to come, with "Elswick cruisers" on a similar design being constructed for Italy, China, Japan, Argentina, Austria and the United States. Protected cruisers became attractive for two reasons. First, the concept of the armored cruiser was not embraced wholeheartedly in naval circles. Second, several navies were caught in a race between armor thickness and the size of main guns and did not have the money to spend on battleships and armored cruisers. The use of smaller, cheaper cruisers was a better alternative.

The French navy adopted the protected cruiser wholeheartedly in the 1880s. The Jeune Ecole school of thought, which proposed a navy composed of fast cruisers for commerce raiding and torpedo-boats for coast defense, was particularly influential in France. Dupuy de Lôme was a revolutionary ship, being the first French armored cruiser to dispose entirely of masts, and sheathed in steel armor. However, she and two others were not sufficiently seaworthy, and their armor could be penetrated by modern quick-firing guns. Thus from 1891–1897 the French reverted to the construction of protected cruisers.

The British Royal Navy was equivocal about which protection scheme to use until 1887. The large , begun in 1881 and finished in 1886, were built as armored cruisers but were often referred to as protected cruisers. While they carried an armored belt some 10 in thick, the belt only covered  of the  length of the ship, and was submerged below the waterline at full load. These ships were also the last armored cruisers to be designed with sails. However, on trials it became clear that the masts and sails did more harm than good; they were removed and replaced by a single military mast with machine guns.

The navy judged the Orlandos inferior to protected cruisers and built exclusively protected cruisers immediately afterwards, including some very large, fast ships like the 14,000-ton . However, the Orlandos were the first class of cruiser to use the triple-expansion engine. Because this type of reciprocating engine used the steam in three stages, it was more fuel-efficient than earlier compound engines. It also used steam of higher pressure, 60 poundforce per square inch, as compared to the 25 to 30 poundforce in earlier engines. With these engineering developments, warships could now dispense with sails and be entirely steam-driven.

The only major naval power to retain a preference for armored cruisers during the 1880s was Russia. The Russian Navy laid down four armored cruisers and one protected cruiser during the decade, all being large ships with sails.

Armored cruisers in the pre-dreadnought era

The development of rapid–fire cannons in the late 1880s forced a change in cruiser design. Since a large number of hits at or near the waterline could negate the effect of water–excluding material used in protected cruisers, side armor again became a priority. Four inches (c. 10 cm) was considered adequate. However, it had to cover not just guns and the waterline but also much of the hull structure in–between; otherwise, the equally new high–explosive shells could penetrate and destroy much of the unarmored portion of the ship. Another development was the publication in 1890 of American naval strategist Alfred Thayer Mahan's book The Influence of Sea Power upon History. While Mahan emphasized the importance of battleships above all other types of warships in obtaining command of the sea, armored cruisers and large protected cruisers could still be used as second-class battleships to maintain control of the sea lanes and potentially as fighting units of a battle fleet.

The armored cruisers built in the mid– to late–1890s were often as large and expensive as pre-dreadnought battleships. They combined long range, high speed and an armament approaching that of battleship with enough armor to protect them against quick-firing guns, considered the most important weapons afloat at the time. Their speed was made possible due to another development, case-hardened steel armor—first Harvey armor and then crucially Krupp armor. The higher tensile strength of these armors compared to nickel steel and mild steel made it feasible to put a light yet useful armor belt on a large cruiser. They saved further weight by not requiring a heavy timber backing, as previous armor plating had, to soften and spread the force of the impact from oncoming shells;  of teak to give a fair surface upon which to attach them was all that was needed. Moreover, this belt could also be much wider than previously, covering the center of the hull, where the ammunition and engines were located, from the main deck to five feet below the waterline. Steel bulkheads added strength to the hull, while armor as thick as the belt covered the guns and heavier protection surrounded the conning tower. With these improvements, the ships became more fully protected than was possible previously. They were also expensive to maintain at fighting strength as they required a greater number of stokers to feed the boilers than a battleship when steaming at flank speed.

The ideas presented by Mahan prompted French Admiral Ernest François Fournier to write his book La flotte necessaire in 1896. Fournier argued that a fleet of technologically advanced armored cruisers and torpedo craft would be powerful and flexible enough to engage in a wide range of activity and overwhelm potential enemies. French naval and government circles embraced this ideal mutually and even advocates of battleships over cruisers admitted the latter's potential usefulness in scouting and commercial warfare. The result was the building of increasingly large armored cruisers. The 12,300-ton  and 14,000-ton  followed.

At 21 knots, the Cressys were slower than the newer French cruisers. However, their  belt of Krupp steel was expected to keep out armor-piercing shells from a  quick-firing gun at likely battle ranges, while their two 9.2-inch (233.7 mm) and 12 6-inch (152 mm) guns offered comparable firepower. The Cressys were the beginning of a rapid expansion in British cruiser construction. Between 1899 and 1905, seven classes of armored cruisers were either completed or laid down, a total of 35 ships.

Japan, which now received British technical assistance in naval matters and purchased larger vessels from France and Britain, began an armored cruiser program of its own. With the end of the First Sino-Japanese War in 1895 and the return under pressure from Russia (in what became known as the "Triple Intervention") of the Liaotung peninsula to China, Japan began a 10-year naval build-up program, under the slogan "Perseverance and determination" (Gashinshōtan) in preparation for further confrontations. They were considered a compromise between cruiser and battleship and were intended to augment capital ship strength in battle squadrons. This practice would persist until World War I.

The first United States armored cruiser, was launched in 1889 but not completed until 1895 due to a three-year delay in the delivery of her armor plate. Armed with four  guns, mounted en echelon (with the fore turret sponsoned to starboard and the aft turret to port) to allow end-on fire for both turrets, and six  guns on broadside, she carried between 7 and 12 inches (178 to 305 mm) of belt armor and between 1 and 4 inches (25 to 102 mm) on her decks. However, Maine was laid down before Harvey or Krupp armor was available and could not benefit from the advantage in weight these much lighter armors offered. She was redesignated a "second-class battleship" in 1894, an awkward compromise reflecting that, at 16.45 knots, she was considerably slower than other cruisers and weaker than first-line battleships. Her destruction in Havana harbor in 1898 was a catalyst in starting the Spanish–American War.

Their armor was comparable in thickness to that of Dupuy de Lôme but the French ship's armor covered a much greater area of the hull. The hull protection of both ships was superior to their main rival, the British , which were the largest cruisers at the time but had no side armor. Armed with six  guns, New York carried more heavy weapons than the French ship. Moreover, New Yorks builder diverged from the Navy blueprint by rearranging her boilers during construction; this allowed the installation of additional transverse and longitudinal bulkheads, which increased her underwater protection. Brooklyn was an improved version of the New York and  designs, more heavily armed (with eight  and 12  guns) and with better sea-keeping abilities through the addition of a forecastle. After these two ships, the Navy concentrated on battleship construction until the Spanish–American War showed how cruisers could be "useful," in the words of General J. B. Crabtree, "and [showed] how desirable others would be."

Shortly after the war ended, the Navy laid down six  armored cruisers to take advantage of lessons learned and better control the large sea areas the nation had just gained. Much larger than their predecessors (displacing 14,500 tons as compared to 8150 for New York), the Pennsylvanias "were closer to light battleships than to cruisers," according to naval historian William Friedman. Improved ammunition made their main guns as powerful as the  guns of the battleship  and their use of state instead of city names, usually reserved for capital ships, emphasized their kinship.

The Spanish-American and First Sino-Japanese wars proved instrumental in spurring cruiser growth among all the major naval powers, according to naval historian Eric Osborne, "as they showcased the abilities of the modern ships in warfare." The only time cruisers were seen in any of their traditional role, he continues, was as blockade ships during the Spanish–American War. More often, they were seen fighting in a battle line. They would not been seen in their designed role until World War I.

Even with all their improvements and apparent performance, opinion on the armored cruiser was mixed. The 1904 edition of the Encyclopedia Americana quotes an otherwise unidentified Captain Walker, USN, in describing the role of the armored cruiser as "that of a vessel possessing in a high degree offensive and defensive qualities, with the capacity of delivering her attack at points far distant from her base in the least space of time." The same source defines an armored cruiser as "a battleship in which the qualities of offense and defense have been much reduced to gain high speed and great coal capacity" and adds, "... there are many who hold that the armored cruiser is an anomaly, something less than a battleship and more than a protected cruiser, performing satisfactorily the duties of neither, with no special function of her own and lacking the great desideratum in warships, ability to fight in proportion to her great size and cost." By 1914 the U.S. Navy in hearings before the House or Representatives gave testimony to the effect that no armored cruisers were further planned nor to it knowledge were armored cruisers being built by any major naval power worldwide.

Battle of Tsushima and appearance of the battlecruiser

Armored cruisers were used with success in the line of battle by the Japanese at the Battle of Tsushima in 1905. Of the battle damage received by the Japanese, the armored cruiser  received eight hits, which destroyed three of her  guns, killed five crew members and injured 90 more (one of the wounded being Isoroku Yamamoto, who would later plan the attack on Pearl Harbor). None of the other Japanese armored cruisers suffered serious damage or large loss of life.  was hit 16 times but no one onboard was killed and only 15 were wounded.

The performance of the Japanese armored cruisers led to a boom in the construction of armored cruisers in the world's navies as some naval authorities concluded that the armored cruiser's superior speed could ensure survivability in a naval action against battleships; they did not take into account the Russian Baltic Fleet's inefficiency and tactical ineptitude during the battle. First Sea Lord "Jacky" Fisher, an advocate of armored cruisers as more useful than battleships to safeguard British trade and territorial interests, saw his efforts justified; his belief that "speed is armor" would lead him to create the battlecruiser. Danish Navy Commander William Hovgaard, who would later become president of New York Shipbuilding and serve on the U.S. Navy's Battleship Design Advisory Board, a group which would help plan the  fast battleships in the 1930s, said, "The fighting capacity of the armored cruiser has reached a point which renders its participation in future fleet actions almost a certainty" and called for a "battleship-cruiser" which would possess the speed of a cruiser and the firepower of a capital ship Other naval authorities remained skeptical. Mahan called the interest in armored cruisers "a fad," then explained:

She is armored, and she is a cruiser; and what have you got? A ship to "lie in the line"? as our ancestors used to say. No, and Yes; that is to say, she may at a pinch, and at a risk that exceeds her powers. A cruiser? Yes, and No; for, order to give her armor and armament which do not fit the line, you have given tonnage beyond what is needed for the speed and coal endurance proper for a cruiser. By giving this tonnage to armor and armament you have taken it from other uses; either from increasing her own speed and endurance, or from providing another cruiser. You have in her more cruiser than she ought to have and less armored vessel, or less cruiser and more armored ship. I do not call this a combination, though I do call it a compromise.... I do not say you have a useless ship. I do say that you have not as useful a ship as, for the tonnage, you ought to have.

Buoyed with their success at Tsushima, Japan laid down the four s between 1905 and 1908. The Tsukubas were intended to take the place of aging battleships and thus showed Japan's intention of continuing to use armored cruisers in fleet engagements. The U.S. Navy raised the main gun caliber of its cruisers with its , laid down between 1902 and 1904. These mounted four  and 16  guns, the former a size previously allocated to battleships. They were built as a fast, powerful response in the eventuality of a Pacific war and were the largest and last American armored cruisers built.

The British also considered  and  guns for its  cruisers, the culmination of its armored cruiser building program. They displaced 14,600 tons, were capable of 23 knots and were armed with four  and 10  guns. By the time these ships were commissioned, Britain possessed the largest armored cruiser force in the world. Undaunted and fully engaged in a naval arms race with the British, the Germans also continued to build armored cruisers, partly from their faith in them as fighting units and commerce raiders, partly from Japan's success. Between 1897 and 1906 they laid down eight of them for use on overseas stations.

Another powerful armored cruiser was the Russian , completed in 1908. Armed with four  in two twin turrets fore and aft and eight  in turrets along the ship's sides, she displaced 15,190 tons and carried a  belt, two armored decks and  armor on her turrets and conning tower. Her top speed was 21 knots. Rurik was unusual in that she was Russian designed but British built; the Russian Navy was not usually a customer of British shipyards. She was reportedly one of the best armored cruisers built, with an advanced sprinkler protection for the magazines. Intended as the first of a three-ship class, Ruriks sisters were cancelled with the advent of the battlecruiser .

"The supreme embodiment of the armored cruiser," in historian Robert K. Massie's words, was the German ship . An enlarged version of the Scharnhorst class with a speed of 24.25 knots, armed with 12  and eight  guns, Blücher was planned as an armored cruiser in part because the British had misled the Germans on the Invincibles then being constructed. The Germans expected these new British ships to be armed with six or eight  guns. One week after the final decision to construct Blücher, the German naval attache learned they would carry eight  guns, the same type mounted on battleships. With no funds available to redesign Blücher, work was ordered to proceed as scheduled. Although much more powerful than a typical armored cruiser, she was significantly weaker than the new British battlecruisers.

By the time these ships were entering service, the armored cruiser as it was then known had reached the end of its development. Tactics and technology favored fighting power over long to medium ranges, which demanded an armament of primarily large caliber guns and a speed higher than that of battleships, preferably by at least 30 percent, to fulfill its traditional role as scout for the fleet and the newly acquired one of participating with battleships in a naval encounter. Thirty percent was the ratio by which frigates had been faster than ships of the line in the days of sail. If a battleship sailed at 20 knots, this would mean that an armored cruiser would have to steam at least 26 or 27 knots. To fulfill these criteria, however, armored cruisers would have to be built much larger and take on a different form than they had in the past. The battlecruiser HMS Invincible and her two sister ships were designed specifically to fulfill these requirements. In a sense they were an extension of the armored cruiser as a fast, heavily armed scout, commerce protector and cruiser-destroyer, reflected in the term originally ascribed to them, "large armored cruiser." However, the battlecruisers were much larger than armored cruisers, allowing them to be faster, more heavily armed, and better-protected, so battlecruisers were able to outpace armored cruisers, stay out of range of their weapons and destroy them with relative impunity. Because they carried the heavy guns normally ascribed to battleships, they could also theoretically hold their place in a battle line more readily than armored cruisers and serve as the "battleship-cruiser" for which Hovgaard had argued after Tsushima. All these factors made battlecruisers attractive fighting units, although Britain, Germany and Japan would be the only powers to build them. They also meant that the armored cruiser as it had been known was now outmoded and no more were built after 1910. The United States Naval Institute put the matter bluntly in its 1908 written proceedings:

It is very doubtful if an armored cruiser of the Colorado class would dare even tackle a monitor, for fear that one of the latter's shot might hit a vital spot, and if it did she would lose her only raison d'etre, for a crippled cruiser would be useless as a cruiser, and still not fit to "lie in the line."... It may be urged that an armored cruiser was never intended to fight a battleship. Then what is she intended for? Surely not as a scout or a commerce destroyer, for vessels a fifth the displacement could do this work as well, and numbers are required here, not strength.... If she is to overtake a weaker enemy, you must first assume a smaller enemy, otherwise she could not have superiority in both speed and strength. By escaping from a stronger enemy she will never win wars.

Later in the same address is this: "Every argument used against [armored cruisers] holds true for battle-cruisers of the Invincible type, except that the latter, if wounded, would be fit to lie in the line, owing to her great armament. If it is hoped to fight at such great ranges that her 7-inch belt and 5-inch side will be of value, then the armor of battleships is wrong, not in principle, but in distribution."

World War I
Although pre-dreadnought battleships and armored cruisers were outclassed by modern battleship and battlecruiser designs, respectively, armored cruisers still played an active role in World War I. Their armor and firepower was sufficient to defeat other cruiser types and armed merchant vessels, while their speed and range made them particularly useful for extended operations out in the high seas. Some German and Royal Navy vessels, like , were allocated to remote naval squadrons. Many other vessels however, were formed into independent squadrons for patrolling European waters and accompanied capital ships every time the latter made forays out of port.

At the Battle of Coronel, the German armored cruisers  and  scored a resounding victory over British naval forces from the West Indies Station. This was one of the last battles involving armored cruisers as the chief adversaries; all subsequent engagements were dominated by battlecruisers and dreadnought battleships. Moreover, the timing could not have been worse for British morale. Six weeks earlier, the armored cruisers ,  and  had all been sunk on the same day by the German submarine U-9.

Five weeks later, the Battle of the Falkland Islands showed graphically how much technology and tactics had changed. The German armored cruisers were too slow to outrun their pursuers, and their initially accurate gunnery failed to inflict serious damage on the British battlecruisers. The British 12-inch guns turned the tide of battle once they started scoring hits on the Germans, and the German armored cruisers were fatally crippled before they had a chance to close the range and use their superior secondary armament. This victory seemed to validate Lord "Jacky" Fisher's justification in building battlecruisers—to track down and destroy armored cruisers with vessels possessing superior speed and firepower. The German force commander Admiral Maximilian von Spee had been wary of the Allies' battlecruisers, especially the Imperial Japanese Navy and the Royal Australian Navy—in fact he described the latter's flagship, the battlecruiser , as being superior to his entire force by itself. At the Falklands, he had already deduced the battle was lost when he missed the chance to attack the British battlecruisers in port.

During the Battle of Dogger Bank,  Blücher was crippled by a shell from a British battlecruiser, which slowed Blücher to 17 knots and eventually sealed her fate. Admiral Franz von Hipper chose to let Blücher go down so his more valuable battlecruisers could escape.

The armor belt was shown to be far less than required to survive the 280mm (11 inch) and 300 mm (12 inch) shells of more modern dreadnoughts and battlecruisers and the cruisers were too slow to get away from them. The final nail in the coffin for the armored cruiser type was in the development of capped armor-piercing shells. The Harvey and Krupp Cemented armor that had looked to offer  protection failed when hit with soft capped AP shells of large enough size. Later hard capped AP shell would only make the matter worse.

Post-World War I

After the end of World War I, many of the surviving armored cruisers were sold for scrap. The Washington Naval Treaty of 1922 placed strict limits on the numbers of "capital ships" possessed by the navies of the great powers. A "capital ship" was defined as any vessel of over 10,000 tons displacement or with guns over 8-in caliber, and several more armored cruisers were decommissioned to comply with the terms of the treaty. The London Naval Treaty of 1930 introduced further limits on cruiser tonnage, and the former role of the armored cruiser was occupied by more modern light cruisers and heavy cruisers (and, in the case of the German navy, panzerschiffe).

Only a small number of armored cruisers survived these limitations, though a handful saw action in World War II in marginal roles;

The Hellenic Navy's , constructed in 1909, served with the British Navy as a convoy escort in the Indian Ocean after the fall of Greece, while a number of Japanese armored cruisers were still active as minelayers or training vessels.

The Imperial Japanese Navy armored cruisers Asama, Izumo, Tokiwa, Iwate, Yakumo, Azuma, & Kasuga were used as training, support, and anti-aircraft ships during the war near the Japanese home islands. Most were sunk by Allied bombings in Japanese harbors.

The Regia Marina's San Giorgio was deployed to Spain to protected Italian interests during the Spanish Civil War. During World War II, she was heavily utilized at the Siege of Tobruk. There she provided anti-aircraft cover and naval gunfire support to Italian units. She was heavily damaged by British aircraft and was scuttled to prevent her capture. Her sister ship, San Marco was decommissioned in 1931 and used as a radio controlled target ship. In 1943, she was scuttled to prevent her capture by the Germans.

The United States Navy's USS Rochester, decommissioned since 1933,  was moored in Subic Bay and used as a receiving ship and anti-aircraft platform. She was later scuttled to prevent her capture by the Japanese during the Invasion of The Philippines.

The Argentine Navy's ARA General Belgrano and ARA Pueyrredón served until 1947 and 1954 respectfully.

The Swedish Navy's HSwMS Fylgia underwent an extensive modernization from 1939-1940 and conducted neutrality patrols in the Baltic Sea during World War II. She continued service until 1953.

The only armored cruiser  still considered to be in existence, as well as in active duty, is the aforementioned  Georgios Averof,  preserved as a museum in Palaio Faliro, Greece.

Differences with heavy cruisers

The armored cruiser was not a close ancestor of heavy cruisers, even though the name might suggest this. The armored cruiser type had come about in a time of transition as one technology after another presented itself. Boilers had become better (though still in need of improvement), and Krupp cemented armor and compound steam engines had arrived. The rate of change was nothing less than staggering and any ship more than 20 years old was found to be completely obsolete. The Italian Navy, unable to afford battleships, produced the Garibaldi-class cruiser of 7,500 tons displacement which was an international success. William H. White DNC of the British Royal Navy was taken by the design and presented the design for the Cressy-class cruiser of 12,000 tons displacement designed from the onset as an adjunct to the pre-dreadnought battle line, on 3 May 1897. As such the armored cruiser is the direct predecessor of and inspiration for the battlecruiser.

The heavy cruiser was a direct product of the First London Naval Treaty of 1930, which divided cruisers into 2 classes between those with larger than 6.1" main guns and those with smaller main guns with both remaining within the limits of the Washington Naval Treaty which limited cruisers to a standard displacement of no more than 10,000 tons, with main guns not exceeding 8 inches (203 mm) caliber. There were also important technical differences between the heavy cruiser and the armored cruiser, some of which reflected the generational gap between them. Heavy cruisers were typically powered by oil-fired superheated steam boilers and steam turbine engines, and were capable of far faster speeds than armored cruisers (propelled by coal-fired reciprocating steam engines of their era) ever had been. Countries withdrawing from the Washington Treaty and the London Naval Treaty of 1930 and Second London Naval Treaty 1936 eventually rendered all limitations on heavy cruisers moot, although the only supersized or large cruisers actually built were the two members of the Alaska class.

See also

 List of ships of the Second World War
 List of cruisers of the Second World War

Citations

References

 Author unidentified, "Thirty-First Meeting of the British Association—with extracts from the Address of Mr. Fairbairn at the opening." In The American Journal of Science and Arts, Second Series (New Haven, Connecticut), Vol. XXXII No. XCVI, November 1861. At Google Books. Accessed 13 April 2012.
 Author unidentified, "Warships, Modern." In Encyclopedia Americana (1904), Volume 16, ed. Beach, Frederick Converse and George Edward Rines. At Google Books. Accessed 9 April 2012.
 Andidora, Ronald, Iron Admirals: Naval Leadership in the Twentieth Century (Praeger, 2000). . Accessed 14 April 2012.
 Baxter, James Phinney, The Introduction of the Ironclad Warship (Classics of Naval Literature) (Harvard University Press, 1933; reprinted with permission by US Naval Institute Press, Annapolis, Maryland, 2000). . Accessed 10 April 2012.
 Beeler, John, Birth of the Battleship: British Capital Ship Design 1870–1881. Caxton, London, 2003. 
 
 
 
 Burr, Lawrence, US Cruisers 1883–1904: The Birth of the Steel Navy (Osprey Publishing, 2008), . Accessed 11 April 2012.
 Conway's All the World's Fighting Ships 1860–1905. Annapolis: Naval Institute Press, 1979. Accessed 11 April 2012.
 Crabtree, Jerome Bruce, The Passing of Spain and the Ascendency of America (Springfield, Mass.: The King-Richardson Company, 1898).   Accessed 14 April 2012.
  Crabtree, Jerome Bruce, The Marvels of Modern Mechanism and Their Relation to Social Betterment (Springfield, Mass.: The King-Richardson Company, 1901). Accessed 9 April 2012.
 Fairbairn, William et al, The Life of Sir William Fairbairn, BART (London: Longmans, Green and Company, 1877), ed. Pole, William FRS.  Accessed 13 April 2012.
 
 
 
 Jane's Fighting Ships 1905/6. Arco Publishing Company, Inc. (reprint) 1970.
 
 Hovgaard, Commander William, "The Cruiser." In Transactions: The Society of Naval Architects and Marine Engineers, Volume 13 (New York: Society of Naval Architects and Marine Engineers, 1905).  Accessed 14 April 2012.]
 
  Mahan, Alfred Thayer, Naval strategy compared and contrasted with the principles and practice of military operations on land: Lectures delivered at the U.S. Naval war college, Newport, R.I., between the years 1887 and 1911 (University of Michigan Library, 1915).  Accessed 14 April 2012.
 
 
 Osborne, Eric. W., "Cruisers." In World War I: A Student Encyclopedia, ed. Tucker, Spencer and Priscilla Mary Roberts. Accessed 9 April 2012.
 Osborne, Eric W., Cruisers and Battle Cruisers: An Illustrated History of Their Impact (ABC-CLIO, 2004). .
 Parkerson, General A. C., ed., How Uncle Sam fights: or, Modern warfare—how conducted (Baltimore: B. H. Woodward Company, 1898).  Accessed 9 April 2012.
 
 
 
 Ropp, Theodore, The Development of a Modern Navy: French Naval Policy, 1871–1904 (Naval Institute press, 1987), ed. Roberts, Stephen S. . Accessed 9 April 2012.
 Sandler, Stanley, Battleships: An Illustrated History of Their Impact (ABC-CLIO, 2004). . At Google Books. Accessed 10 April 2012.
 
 Stirling, Commander Yates, USN, "Another Argument for Speed in Battleship Design." In Naval Institute Proceedings, Volume 34 (Annapolis, Maryland: United States Naval Institute, 1908).  Accessed 13 April 2012.

External links

 British and German Armored Cruisers of the First World War

Ship types
 
Russian inventions